The 1936 Boston Red Sox season was the 36th season in the franchise's Major League Baseball history. The Red Sox finished sixth in the American League (AL) with a record of 74 wins and 80 losses,  games behind the New York Yankees, who went on to win the 1936 World Series.

Offseason 
 December 10, 1935: Gordon Rhodes, George Savino (minors), and $150,000 were traded by the Red Sox to the Philadelphia Athletics for Jimmie Foxx and Johnny Marcum.

Regular season

Season standings

Record vs. opponents

Opening Day lineup

Roster

Player stats

Batting

Starters by position 
Note: Pos = Position; G = Games played; AB = At bats; H = Hits; Avg. = Batting average; HR = Home runs; RBI = Runs batted in

Other batters 
Note: G = Games played; AB = At bats; H = Hits; Avg. = Batting average; HR = Home runs; RBI = Runs batted in

Pitching

Starting pitchers 
Note: G = Games pitched; IP = Innings pitched; W = Wins; L = Losses; ERA = Earned run average; SO = Strikeouts

Other pitchers 
Note: G = Games pitched; IP = Innings pitched; W = Wins; L = Losses; ERA = Earned run average; SO = Strikeouts

Relief pitchers 
Note: G = Games pitched; W = Wins; L = Losses; SV = Saves; ERA = Earned run average; SO = Strikeouts

Farm system 

LEAGUE CHAMPIONS: Eau Claire

References

External links
1936 Boston Red Sox team page at Baseball Reference
1936 Boston Red Sox season at baseball-almanac.com

Boston Red Sox seasons
Boston Red Sox
Boston Red Sox
1930s in Boston